The Evstafi class were a pair of pre-dreadnought battleships of the Imperial Russian Navy built before World War I for the Black Sea Fleet. Numerous alterations were made as a result of experience in the Russo-Japanese War of 1904–5 that seriously delayed the completion of the two ships.

They were the most modern ships in the Black Sea Fleet when World War I began and formed the core of the fleet for the first year of the war, before the newer dreadnoughts entered service. They forced the German battlecruiser  to disengage during the Battle of Cape Sarych shortly after Russia declared war on the Ottoman Empire in late 1914. Both ships covered several bombardments of the Bosphorus fortifications in early 1915, including one where they were attacked by the Goeben, but they managed to drive her off. Later, Evstafi and Ioann Zlatoust were relegated to secondary roles after the first dreadnought entered service in late 1915, and were subsequently put into reserve in 1918 in Sevastopol.

Both ships were captured when the Germans took the city in May 1918 and were turned over to the Allies after the Armistice in November 1918. Their engines were destroyed in 1919 by the British when they withdrew from Sevastopol to prevent the advancing Bolsheviks from using them against the White Russians. They were abandoned when the Whites evacuated the Crimea in 1920 and were scrapped in 1922–23.

Description

General characteristics
The Evstafi-class were slightly larger than Potemkin, being  longer,  wider, but displaced  less. The ships had a double bottom from frames 18 to 82. They were divided into 10 main compartments by transverse watertight bulkheads. They also had a centreline longitudinal bulkhead, presumably separating the engine rooms.

Propulsion
Two steam-powered dynamos were carried with a total output of 300 kW, as well as two auxiliary dynamos rated at 64 kW each.

Armament
The main armament consisted of two pairs of 12-inch 40-calibre Pattern 1895 guns mounted in hydraulically powered twin turrets fore and aft. Each turret had a firing arc of 260 degrees. The guns had a rate of fire of 40 seconds between rounds and 75 rounds per gun were carried. These guns had a maximum elevation of 35 degrees and could depress to -5 degrees.

All four  50-calibre Pattern 1905 guns were mounted in the corners of the superstructure in armoured casemates. These guns had a firing arc of 120 degrees and could fire straight ahead or astern. They had a range of elevation from -5 degrees to +20 degrees.

The dozen  Canet Pattern 1892 45-calibre guns were mounted in the lower casemates. The guns could elevate to a maximum of 20 degrees and depress to -5 degrees. They had a maximum range of  when fired at maximum elevation. The ships carried 180 rounds per gun.

The anti-torpedo boat armament consisted of fourteen  Canet Pattern 1892 50-calibre guns mounted in sponsons on the upper deck, protected by gun shields. The rate of fire was between 12 and 15 rounds per minute.

The Evstafi class carried two  torpedo tubes on the broadside aft. These torpedoes carried a  warhead of TNT.

Protection
The Evstafi-class ships used Krupp armour. The belt terminated in  transverse bulkheads.

The upper belt was six inches thick and was intended to protect the gap between the waterline belt and the casemate. Their barbettes were also 10 inches thick, although this was reduced to five inches where they were screened behind other armour.

Ships
Construction of both ships began well before the formal keel-laying ceremony; Evstafi on 13 July 1904 and Ioann Zlatoust on 13 July 1903, although the working drawings and preliminary calculations were not approved until 31 May 1904, which caused some problems with Ioann Zlatoust. Progress was relatively quick, despite the disruptions caused by the 1905 Revolution, and both ships were launched less than three years after work began. Fitting-out, however, was considerably delayed by a number of changes made as the navy digested the lessons of the Russo-Japanese War. Maximum elevation of the main guns was increased from 15 degree to 35 degrees, the number of torpedo tubes was reduced from five to two, mine stowage was eliminated as were the  guns. The armour protection of the waterline fore and aft of the main belt was increased to prevent the sort of damage that disabled several ships at the Battle of Tsushima. A second conning tower was added at the rear of the superstructure and its design was altered, probably to eliminate the overhanging top that deflected splinters into the conning tower at the Battle of the Yellow Sea and Tsushima. The masts and their fighting tops were replaced by light pole masts and light booms replaced the heavy boat cranes to save weight.

World War I

Evstafi, as the newest ship in the Black Sea Fleet, was the flagship of Vice Admiral Andrei Eberhardt for the first year or so of World War I. Two weeks after the Russian declaration of war on the Ottoman Empire on 2 November 1914, the Black Sea Fleet set out to bombard Trebizond on 15 November. The force consisted of the pre-dreadnoughts Evstafi, Ioann Zlatoust,  and three cruisers escorted by three destroyers and 11 torpedo boats. They did this successfully on the morning of 17 November and then turned west to hunt for Turkish shipping along the Anatolian coast before setting course for Sevastopol later that afternoon. The following day, while en route, the ships were intercepted by the German battlecruiser Goeben and the light cruiser  in what came to be known as the Battle of Cape Sarych.

Despite the noon hour the conditions were foggy and the capital ships initially did not spot each other. The Black Sea Fleet had experimented on concentrating fire from several ships under the control of a "master ship" before the war and Evstafi held her fire until Ioann Zlatoust, the master ship, could see Goeben. She scored a hit with her first salvo as a 12-inch shell partially penetrated the armor casemate protecting one of Goebens  secondary guns. It detonated some of the ready-use ammunition, starting a fire that burnt out the casemate and killed its crew.

Goeben returned fire shortly afterward and hit Evstafi in the middle funnel; the shell detonated after it passed through the funnel and destroyed the antennae for the fire-control radio, which meant that Evstafi could not correct Ioann Zlatousts inaccurate range data. The other ships either used Ioann Zlatousts incorrect data or never saw Goeben and failed to register any hits on the German ship. Goeben hit Evstafi four more times, although one shell failed to detonate, before Rear Admiral Wilhelm Souchon decided to turn away and break contact after fourteen minutes of combat. Evstafi suffered 34 killed and 24 wounded from those hits, and only fired between 12 and 16 twelve-inch shells, as well as 14 eight-inch and 19 six-inch shells. Ioann Zlatoust fired only six shells from her main armament.

Several armour plates on Evstafi required replacement after the battle and they were taken from the old pre-dreadnought , allowing the repairs to be complete by 29 November. On 9 January 1915 Breslau and the  encountered the Russian fleet while returning from a bombardment mission in the eastern part of the Black Sea. During a minor engagement Breslau hit Evstafis forward turret, temporarily putting it out of action, after which the two cruisers escaped using their superior speed.

Coast bombardment
Evstafi and Ioann Zlatoust served as the covering force for several bombardment missions of the Bosphorus between 18 March and 9 May 1915. Admiral Eberhardt then ordered his ships to make only , while Goeben was making . Goeben was unable to cross the T of the Russian ships, despite its superior speed, as they were continually turning. This maneuver bought enough time that Tri Sviatitelia and Pantelimon were able to rejoin the other two ships before they could start shelling the Ottoman forts. Pantelimon then  hit Goeben twice before the German ship broke contact after 22 minutes of firing. With the fleet assembled Admiral Eberhardt attempted to pursue the German battlecruiser, but was unsuccessful.

Both ships were subsequently fitted with anti-aircraft guns on top of each of their turrets during 1915, and screens were added on top of their funnels to keep out light bombs. Ioann Zlatoust initially received four 75-millimetre guns, but this was later altered to a pair of 75 mm guns and another pair of  guns. Evstafi first received three 75 mm guns, but these were later replaced by two 63.5 mm guns and a pair of  guns. On 1 August 1915 she, and all the other pre-dreadnoughts, were transferred to the 2nd Battleship Brigade, after the dreadnought  had entered service. On 1 October the new dreadnought provided cover while Ioann Zlatoust and Pantelimon bombarded Zonguldak and Evstafi shelled the nearby town of Kozlu. Later, both Evstafi-class ships participated in the second bombardment of Varna in May 1916.

Evstafi and Ioann Zlatoust were reduced to reserve in March 1918 in Sevastopol. Immobile, they were captured by the Germans there in May and handed over to the Allies the following December. The British wrecked their engines between 22–24 April 1919 when they left the Crimea in order to prevent the advancing Bolsheviks from using them against the White Russians. Later, they were captured by both sides during the Russian Civil War, but were abandoned by the White Russians when they evacuated the Crimea in November 1920. The ships were then scrapped in 1922–1923, although they were not stricken from the navy list until 21 November 1925.

Footnotes

Citations

References

External links

 ship history on Black Sea Fleet 
 ship history on Black Sea Fleet 
 КОРАБЛІ УКРАЇНСЬКОЇ ФЛОТИ (1917 - 1918 рр.) – Ukrainian Navy (1917-1918) 
 Ukrainian Navy: ferial excursions into the past and present

Battleship classes
 Evstafi class battleship
 Evstafi class battleship